Mail robbery is the robbery of mail usually when it is in the possession, custody, or control, of the delivering authority, which in most countries is the postal operator and can involve the theft of money or luxury goods.

History

In the UK stage coach (from 1784 Mail coach) robberies by highwaymen were common, despite the death penalty. For example, in 1722 two were executed for robbing the Bristol mail.

Robberies from trains also began early. An early example was on the Bristol and Exeter Railway in 1849.

In the USA, the period immediately following the First World War witnessed a large number of mail robberies. Eventually, the frequency of these thefts caused the Department of the Navy to place armed Marines on all mail trains.

A number of high-value mail robberies occurred in the UK after the Second World War, as a result of a lack of improvements in security in the transport of money. One major example was the Eastcastle Street robbery in 1952, involving the theft of £287,000 from a post office van in London. Overall that year, 629 mailbags went missing, and in the following year the figure was 738.

The two most significant mail robberies both occurred in the early 1960s. In the UK, £2.6 million was taken in the 'Great Train Robbery' of 1963. A year earlier, $1.5 million was stolen from the hold-up of a U.S. Mail truck in Massachusetts. By the end of the 1960s, however, mail robbery had become less common.

See also
Package pilferage
Alvin Karpis
Charles Bolles alias Black Bart
Dave Rudabaugh
Mail fraud
Postal robbery in the Subach
 Plymouth Mail robbery
Roadblock (1951 film)
Ronnie Biggs
Roy Gardner (bank robber)
Sallins Train Robbery
Stagecoach
Thomas James Holden
United States Postal Inspection Service
William Quantrill
Wyatt Earp

References

Robbery
Postal systems
Organized crime activity